Jordan Connor Stout (born August 4, 1998) is an American football punter for the Baltimore Ravens of the National Football League (NFL). He played college football at Virginia Tech and Penn State.

Early life and high school career
Stout grew up in Honaker, Virginia and attended Honaker High School. He was a three time All-State selection at kicker. Stout was named the Tigers' team MVP as a senior after making all nine of his field goal attempts and averaging 47 yards per punt.

College career

Virginia Tech 
Stout began his college career at Virginia Tech and redshirted his true freshman season after joining the team as a walk-on. As a redshirt freshman, Stout served as a kickoff specialist for the Hokies and recorded 60 touchbacks on 71 kickoff attempts. After the end of the season, Stout entered the NCAA transfer portal.

Penn State 
Stout committed to transfer to Penn State, who offered him an athletic scholarship.

Stout was eligible to play immediately at Penn State because he was not a scholarship player at Virginia Tech. He served primarily as the Nittany Lions kickoff specialist in his first season with the team and finished fourth in the FBS with 66 touchbacks and made two of three field goal attempts, including a school record 57-yard field goal against Pittsburgh. As a redshirt junior, Stout was named Penn State's punter in addition to kickoffs and averaged 41.5 yards per punt. He was named Penn State's kicker entering his redshirt senior season and became the first player to handle kickoffs, field goals, and punts for the team since Chris Bahr in 1975. Stout punted 67 times for 3,083 yards with a 46.0 yard average and was named first-team All-Big Ten Conference and the Eddleman–Fields Punter of the Year. He also made 16 of 23 field goal attempts and 34 of 36 extra point attempts. Following the end of the season, Stout declared that he would enter the 2022 NFL Draft.

Professional career

Stout was selected by the Baltimore Ravens in the fourth round, 130th overall, of the 2022 NFL Draft. He was slated to be the new starter after the retirement of long time punter Sam Koch.

References

External links
 Baltimore Ravens bio
Virginia Tech Hokies bio
Penn State Nittany Lions bio

Living people
American football punters
Penn State Nittany Lions football players
People from Tazewell County, Virginia
Virginia Tech Hokies football players
Players of American football from Virginia
American football placekickers
1998 births
Baltimore Ravens players